The Armed Forces of the Argentine Republic, in , are controlled by the Commander-in-Chief (the President) and a civilian Minister of Defense. In addition to the Army, Navy and Air Force, there are two security forces, controlled by the Ministry of Security, which can be mobilized in occasion of an armed conflict: the National Gendarmerie, a gendarmerie used to guard borders and places of strategic importance; and the Naval Prefecture, a coast guard used to protect internal major rivers and maritime territory.

Traditionally, Argentina maintains close defense cooperation and military-supply relationships with the United States  and to a lesser extent, with Israel, Canada, Germany, France, Spain, Belarus, Italy, and Russia.

History

The oldest forces of the Argentinian military are the Argentinian Army and the Argentinian Navy, both created in 1810, during the Argentine War of Independence, while the Argentinian Air Force was established in 1945. The Argentine military played a role in the institutional life of the country, during a series of coups d'état that took place in the 20th century.

1955–1963 internal strife

After the Revolución Libertadora coup that deposed president Juan Domingo Perón in 1955, the armed forces split into opposing sectors named Azules y colorados ("Blues and Reds"). The fight would end in 1963 with military clashes and the defeat of the reds who were opposed to Perón.

1965 Operacion 90 

In 1965, the Argentine military conducted land military maneuvers on Antarctica under then-Colonel Jorge E. Leal. Nicknamed Operación 90, this was undertaken ten years before the Antarctic Treaty came into being and was conducted to cement Argentina's claims to a portion of those territories (still claimed as Argentine Antarctica).

1975 Counter-insurgency 

In 1975 the armed forces started a massive operation in the Tucumán Province to crush the ERP (Ejército Revolucionario del Pueblo or People's Revolutionary Army) guevarist guerrilla group which attempted to create a "revolutionary foco in this remote and mountainous province, in the north-west of Argentina."

National Reorganization Process

The last military dictatorship, the National Reorganization Process, lasted from 1976 to 1983. As Isabel Perón was unable to defeat the terrorist organizations of Montoneros and ERP, the military took power during the 1976 Argentine coup d'état and exterminated the violent communist guerrillas by random detentions, torture or death. The current government of Cristina Fernández de Kirchner that sympathizes with Perón, antagonized the Armed Forces with the justification of the past junta and limits the powers of the current armed forced to avoid state terrorism of the past.

1978 Beagle Conflict

During much of the 19th and the 20th century, relations between neighbour Chile chilled due to disputes over Patagonia, though in recent years relations have improved dramatically.

1982 Falklands War

On 2 April 1982, Argentine forces invaded the British overseas territory of the Falkland Islands; this was followed by the invasion of South Georgia islands. Britain sent a big task force to recover the islands. Argentina incurred many losses and surrendered on 14 June. The political effects of the surrender were strong, leading to large protests against the dictatorship, which hastened its downfall.

1983 transition to democracy

The democratic government of Raúl Alfonsín that took office in 1983 prosecuted the 1970s crimes and made the unprecedented (and only Latin American example) Trial of the Juntas and soon the Army was rocked by uprisings and internal infighting. Far-right sectors of the Army rebelled in the Carapintadas (painted faces) movement. To contain the rebellions, Alfonsín promoted the Full stop law and the Law of due obedience. The following president, Carlos Menem, gave the presidential pardon to the military found guilty in the Trial of the Juntas. It would not be until 1990, when the last military uprising in Argentine history was crushed, that the political conflict within the Army finally subsided.

In January 1989, during the subversive attack on La Tablada,  the Army used white phosphorus  in a violation of the Geneva Convention (according to a document presented by the human rights commission of the United Nations on January 12, 2001).

Gulf War and 1990s 
Argentina was the only Latin American country to participate in the 1991 Gulf War sending a destroyer and a corvette in first term and a supply ship and another corvette later to participate on the United Nations blockade and sea control effort of the gulf. The success of "Operación Alfil" (English: "Operation Bishop") as it was known, with more than 700 interceptions and  sailed on the operations theatre helped to overcome the so-called "Malvinas syndrome".

From 1990 to 1992, the Baradero-class patrol boats were deployed under UN mandate ONUCA to the Gulf of Fonseca in Central America. In 1994, the three Drummond-class corvettes participated on Operation Uphold Democracy in Haiti.

Also, in the 1990s, Argentine Armed Forces began a close defense cooperation and friendship policy with neighbors Brazil and Chile, with emphasis on fulfillment of United Nations mandates.

The Argentine military have been reduced both in number and budget, but became more professional, especially after conscription was abolished by president Menem. The British embargo due to the Falklands War  was officially eliminated and Argentina was granted Major Non-NATO ally status by United States President Bill Clinton.

Present 

The modern Argentine Armed Forces are committed to international peacekeeping under United Nations mandates, humanitarian aid on emergencies relief and support the country's continuous presence at Antarctica.

Democratic governments since 1983 streamlined the military budget and did not approve any large scale equipment purchases.  Argentina military spending is one of the lowest of South America and as of 2010, its 0.9% of GDP only exceeds Suriname Within the defence budget itself funding for training and even basic maintenance was significantly cut, a factor contributing to the accidental loss of the Argentine submarine San Juan in 2017. The result has been a steady erosion of Argentine military capabilities, with some arguing that Argentina had, by the end of the 2010s, ceased to be a capable military power.

The small-scale capability modernization that Argentina has attempted has been actively opposed by the United Kingdom. In 2019 the Argentine Air Force and government selected the Korean KAI FA-50 as its interim fighter to replace its aging Falklands-vintage aircraft. However, the deal was cancelled in early 2020 leaving the Air Force without a fighter replacement. British intervention was apparently a key factor in the cancellation with Britain stopping the export of the aircraft incorporating various British components. In October 2020, Korea Aerospace Industries (KAI) confirmed that since major components of the aircraft were supplied by the U.K., the aircraft could not be exported to Argentina. Britain similarly blocked the potential sale of Brazilian license-built Saab Gripen aircraft to Argentina given avionics that were of British origin.

In 2003, for the first time, the Argentine Navy (classified as a major non-NATO ally) interoperated with a United States Navy battlegroup when destroyer ARA Sarandí (D-13) joined the USS Enterprise Carrier Strike Group and Destroyer Squadron 18 as a part of Exercise Solid Step during their tour in the Mediterranean Sea.

On June 12, 2006, President Néstor Kirchner brought into force the Defense Law, which had been passed in 1988 as a means to modernize the doctrine of the armed forces and define their role. The law states that the armed forces will only be used against foreign aggression, and reduces the powers of the heads of the armed services, centralizing whole operational and acquisitions decisions under the authority of the Armed Forces Joint General Staff ( – EMC ) emphasizing Jointness.

In 2007, an agreement for cooperation in peace operations was signed with France.

A combined Argentinian-Chilean force for future United Nations Mandates was created. Named Cruz del Sur, the new force began assembly in 2008 with its headquarters alternating between the two countries each year.

In 2009, UNASUR, the South American countries union, created the CDS ( Spanish: Consejo de Defensa Sudamericano (South American Defence council) in order to promote cooperation and transparency between their armed forces

As of 2011, they perform with Chile the PARACACH (Patrulla de Rescate Antártica Combinada Argentina-Chile, Argentine Chilean Antarctic combined search and rescue patrol) with support from the German Space Agency which provided satellite imagery

Structure
The three branches of the Argentine Armed Forces are under the direct authority of the Defense Ministry, while the Argentine National Gendarmerie and the Argentine Naval Prefecture, as security forces, under the direct authority of the Ministry of Security.

International participation
Argentina was the only South American country to send warships and cargo planes in 1991 to the Gulf War under UN mandate and has remained involved in peacekeeping efforts in multiple locations like UNPROFOR in Croatia/Bosnia, Gulf of Fonseca, UNFICYP in Cyprus (where among Army and Marines troops the Air Force provided the UN Air contingent since 1994) and MINUSTAH in Haiti.

UNFICYP was also a precedent in the Latin American military as troops of Bolivia, Brazil, Chile, Paraguay, Peru and Uruguay are embedded in the Argentine contingent

Since 1999 and as of June 2006, Argentina is the only Latin American country to maintain troops in Kosovo during SFOR (and later EUFOR) operations where combat engineers of the Argentine Armed Forces are embedded in an Italian brigade.

In 2007, an Argentine contingent including helicopters, boats and water purification plants was sent to help Bolivia against their worst floods in decades. In 2010 the Armed Forces were also involved in Haiti and Chile humanitarian responses after their respective earthquakes.

Argentine military forces formed part of

Haiti - UN MINUSTAH video ( Including the Mobile Field Hospital and helicopters )
Cyprus - UN UNFICYP ( including ARGAIR helicopters )
Serbia/Province Kosovo - NATO KFOR (CICKO) pictorial
Serbia/Province Kosovo - UN UNMIK
Belgium - NATO ICC-SHAPE
Bosnia - NATO EUFOR
And as military observers in UNTSO, MINURSO, UNMIL, MONUC, UNMIS and UNOCI

NOCI.

Argentina was also responsible for the White Helmets initiative.

Gallery

See also

Argentine Air Force
Argentine Army
Argentine Army Aviation
Argentine Navy
Argentine Naval Aviation
Insignia and badges of the Armed Forces of the Argentine Republic
Military ranks of Argentina
Argentine defense industry
Argentina and weapons of mass destruction
Foreign relations of Argentina

References

Notes

Sources

Further reading

External links
  

 
Military of Argentina